Pokkesviricetes is a class of viruses.

Orders
The following orders are recognized:

 Asfuvirales
 Chitovirales

References

Viruses